Catephia lobata is a species of moth of the  family Erebidae. It is found in Indonesia (Sumatra).

References

Catephia
Moths described in 1928
Moths of Indonesia